The Bleriot-SPAD S.37 was a small French airliner developed soon after World War I.

Design
The S.37 was a sedan-style airliner where the passengers were placed in open cabin in front of the pilot.

Specifications

See also

References

Blériot aircraft
Biplanes
Single-engined tractor aircraft
1920s French airliners
Aircraft first flown in 1920